Kowalski & Schmidt is a German-Polish television magazine with topics from everyday life, culture, politics, science and the social sector, is jointly presented by Adriana Rozwadowska and Martin Adam alternately in Germany and Poland.

First broadcast was on January 3, 1993, on ORB Fernsehen of Ostdeutscher Rundfunk Brandenburg (ORB) under the title Kowalski & Co, between March 1995 and the end of 2011 as Kowalski trifft Schmidt. It moved in 2001 from the ORB to the Mitteldeutscher Rundfunk (MDR), where it ran at MDR Fernsehen until the end of 2011. From 2004, the programme was also broadcast by rbb Fernsehen and renamed to today's title in 2012.

Since September 2017, the journal has been produced in cooperation with the Polish daily newspaper Gazeta Wyborcza where the current female host Adriana Rozwadowska is a business editor. It is broadcast in both countries in the respective third programme (TVP3 Wrocław/rbb Fernsehen) in a Polish and a German version. Current broadcasting slot on the German rbb Fernsehen: every 14 days on Saturdays from 5.25 pm to 5.55 pm.

Former hosts
Daniel Finger
Ola Rosiak
Max Ruppert
Anna Posnanska
Fabian Maier
Daniel Jander
Maura Ladosz
Johanna Rubinroth

References

External links
 

1993 German television series debuts
2000s German television series
2010s German television series
1993 establishments in Germany
Rundfunk Berlin-Brandenburg
Ostdeutscher Rundfunk Brandenburg